Jeanette M. Allred-Powless (born December 17, 1961) is a Guamanian former long-distance runner. She competed in the women's marathon at the 1992 Summer Olympics. She also competed for Guam in seven World Athletics Championships and won three golds and a silver at the South Pacific Games. She was educated at American River College, California State University, Northridge, the University of North Florida and California State University, Sacramento. After retiring from competition she took up coaching, acting as coach of the men's and women's running programs at Sierra College before joining her alma mater American River College in 2000 as head coach for women's track and field and cross country, where she led her track and field team to the third state title in ARC's history in 2007. She is the mother of professional cyclists Shayna Powless and Neilson Powless.

References

External links
 

1961 births
Living people
Athletes (track and field) at the 1992 Summer Olympics
Guamanian female long-distance runners
Guamanian female marathon runners
Olympic track and field athletes of Guam
Track and field athletes from Los Angeles
American River College alumni
California State University, Northridge alumni
University of North Florida alumni
California State University, Sacramento alumni
College track and field coaches in the United States
21st-century American women